Mærsk Mc-Kinney Møller is the first ship of Maersk Line's  of container vessels. At the time of its entry into service in 2013, it had the largest cargo capacity in twenty-foot equivalent unit (TEU) of any vessel, and was the longest container ship in service worldwide. Constructed for Maersk by Daewoo Shipbuilding & Marine Engineering (DSME) of South Korea, it was launched in February 2013 and began operational service during July 2013. It was named for Mærsk Mc-Kinney Møller, the CEO of Maersk from 1965 to 1993. The ship is the first of a class of 20 identical vessels.

Design overview
Mærsk Mc-Kinney Møller was the world's largest and most efficient operational container ship at the time of its completion, totalling  in length and with a cargo capacity of 18,270 TEU containers. However, due to its size, cost, and use of twin engines, its efficiency is reduced severely if it is not fully loaded; the shipping analyst Richard Meade asserts that it is "probably the most inefficient ship ever built" when loaded to less than 50%. During normal operations, Mærsk Mc-Kinney Møller is manned by a crew of 19, although it has sufficient accommodation for 34 crew.

Career

The contract for the construction of Mærsk Mc-Kinney Møller was signed on 21 February 2011. Work began with a steel cutting ceremony at the DSME shipyard at Okpo, Geoje, South Korea, on 18 June 2012. The hull was laid on 27 November 2012 and the boat was officially launched on 24 February 2013.

The Mærsk Mc-Kinney Møller left the Daewoo shipyards in an operational capacity in July 2013, whereupon it began sea trials. Initially, it was forced to operate at much less than its maximum cargo capacity, as most ports certified to handle Triple E-class vessels at that time lacked gantry cranes tall enough to load the ship completely. In August 2013, it made its first transit of the Suez Canal. In January 2014, the Mærsk Mc-Kinney Møller arrived at its first operational port of call, Singapore. In November 2014, the Mærsk Mc-Kinney Møller was superseded as the world's largest container ship by China Shipping Container Lines' .

See also

 , the class preceding the Triple E

References

External links

Container ships
Ships of the Maersk Line
Construction records
2013 ships